Juglans ailantifolia (synonyms J. cordiformis and J. sieboldiana and J. mandshurica var. sachalinensis), the Japanese walnut ( oni-gurumi), is a species of walnut native to Japan and Sakhalin. The leaves are pinnate, 50–90 cm long, with 11-17 leaflets, each leaflet 7–16 cm long and 3–5 cm broad. The whole leaf is downy-pubescent, and a somewhat brighter, yellower green than many other tree leaves. The male flowers are inconspicuous yellow-green catkins produced in spring at the same time as the new leaves appear. The female flowers have pink/ red pistils. The fruit is a nut, produced in bunches of 4-10 together; the nut is spherical, 3–5 cm long and broad, surrounded by a green husk before maturity in mid autumn.

Uses
The edible nuts have an oily texture. The husks are also used to make a yellowish dye.

The very bold, decorative leaves and the attractive catkins produced in spring make it an excellent ornamental tree for planting in parks and large gardens.

Unlike the closely related and very similar North American butternut, Japanese walnut is resistant to the canker disease caused by the fungus Sirococcus clavigignenti-juglandacearum. This has led to its being planted as a replacement for butternuts in North America. The two species hybridise readily; the resulting hybrid Juglans x bixbyi (otherwise known as J. cinerea x ailantifolia or 'buartnut') is also resistant to canker and is likewise planted as a replacement for butternuts. Japanese walnut is distinguished from butternut by its larger leaves and round (not oval) nuts.  Prospect Rock Permaculture in Vermont has been backcrossing buartnuts with native butternuts, resulting in 'butterbuarts', which will most likely bear greater resemblance to the butternut parentage, although may also be more susceptible to the canker.

The wood is light and takes polish well, but is of much lower quality than Persian walnut wood. It is often used to make furniture.

Cultivars
The heartnut is a cultivar of Japanese walnut distinguished by its fruit, which is heart-shaped in cross-section, very hard to crack, and able to yield unbroken nut meat when cracked. The heartnut is a sweet nut without a bitter aftertaste often intrinsic with black and Persian walnuts. This is the subspecies that hybridizes with butternuts, creating 'buartnuts', or Juglans x bixbyi.
Toyo Tire evaluated that the shell was very hard and that the fragments were sharp, and it came to be used as a material for snow tires (studless tires).

Diseases
The only significant disease Japanese walnuts are susceptible to is the Walnut Bunch Disease.

External links

ailantifolia
Flora of Japan
Flora of Sakhalin
Japanese fruit